Jack Johnson (3 July 1924 – 24 April 2002) was a Danish footballer. He played in four matches for the Denmark national football team from 1951 to 1954.

References

External links
 

1924 births
2002 deaths
Danish men's footballers
Denmark international footballers
Place of birth missing
Association footballers not categorized by position